Brandon Childress may refer to:
 Bam Childress, gridiron football wide receiver
 Brandon Childress (basketball), American basketball player